Perles may refer to

Perles, Aisne, a commune in the Aisne department in Picardie in northern France
Perles-et-Castelet, a commune in the Ariège department in southwestern France
Perles, the French name for Pieterlen, Switzerland
Alfred Perlès (1897–1990), Austrian-British writer
George Perles (1934–2020), American football coach
Joseph Perles (1835–1894), Hungarian rabbi
Micha Perles, Israeli mathematician
Perles configuration
Tessalon Perles

See also
Perle (disambiguation)
Perls